Nico Burchert (born 24 June 1987) is a German former professional footballer who played as a goalkeeper and works as goalkeeping coach for SC Paderborn.

Playing career
Burchert started his senior career with Hertha BSC II. In the 2006–07 season he played five matches in the Regionalliga Nord, never managing to keep a clean sheet. For the 2007–08 season Hertha II were relegated to NOFV-Oberliga Nord. Burchert played six matches and kept four clean sheets. In July 2008 Burchert transferred to 3. Liga club SC Paderborn. He played his first match for the club and first fully professional game on 12 May 2009 in a 2–0 loss against Werder Bremen II.

Coaching career
In June 2016, after having already served as goalkeeping coach for the youth teams of SC Paderborn, he was appointed the same role for the first team.

Personal life
His brother Sascha currently plays as a goalkeeper for Hertha BSC.

Career statistics

References

External links
 Nico Burchert at SCPaderborn07.de 
 

Living people
1987 births
German footballers
Footballers from Berlin
Association football goalkeepers
3. Liga players
Regionalliga players
Hertha BSC II players
SC Paderborn 07 players